KUFW may refer to:

 KUFW (FM), a radio station (106.3 FM) licensed to serve Kingsburg, California, United States
 KLXY (FM), a radio station (90.5 FM) licensed to serve Woodlake, California, which held the call sign KUFW from 1981 to 2019